Michiel Heyns (born 2 December 1943) is a South African author, translator and academic.

He went to school in Thaba 'Nchu, Kimberley and Grahamstown, and later studied at the University of Stellenbosch and Cambridge University before serving as a professor of English at the University of Stellenbosch, from 1983 until 2003.

Since then he has concentrated on his writing full-time, and has won numerous awards for his reviews, translations and novels.

Novels
The Children’s Day, Jonathan Ball (2002)
The Reluctant Passenger, Jonathan Ball (2003)
The Typewriter's Tale, Jonathan Ball (2005)
Bodies Politic, Jonathan Ball (2008)
Lost Ground, Jonathan Ball (2011)
Invisible Furies, Jonathan Ball (2012)
A Sportful Malice, Jonathan Ball (2014)
I am Pandarus, Jonathan Ball (2017)
A Poor Season for Whales,  Jonathan Ball (2020)

Translations
Marlene van Niekerk, Agaat (2006)
Marlene van Niekerk, Memorandum: A Story with pictures (2006)
Tom Dreyer, Equatoria (2008)
Etienne van Heerden, 30 Nights in Amsterdam (2011)
Chris Barnard, Bundu (2011)
Eben Venter, Wolf, Wolf (2013)
Ingrid Winterbach, It Might Get Loud (2015)
Ingrid Winterbach, The Shallows (2017)
Ingrid Winterbach,  The Troubled Times of Magrieta Prinsloo (2019)
Elsa Joubert:  Cul-de-Sac (2019)
Willem Anker, Red Dog (2019)

Awards
2006 Thomas Pringle Award for Reviews in 2006
2007 Sol Plaatje Prize for Translation for Agaat 
2008 South African Translators' Institute Prize for Agaat
2009 Herman Charles Bosman Award for Bodies Politic 
2010 Thomas Pringle Award for Reviews in 2010
2012 Herman Charles Bosman Award for Lost Ground
2012 The Sunday Times Fiction Prize for Lost Ground
2013 Prix de l'Union Interalliee for the French Translation of The Typewriter's Tale
2015 Herman Charles Bosman Award for A Sportful Malice
2019 SALA Prize for Literary Translation for  Red Dog. 
2020 Sol Plaatje Prize for Translation for The Shallows  
2021 University of Johannesburg Prize for Literary Translation for Red Dog

References

Afrikaner people
People from Stellenbosch
South African male novelists
1943 births
Living people
Stellenbosch University alumni